Threads of Destiny is a lost 1914 silent drama film directed by Joseph W. Smiley and starring Evelyn Nesbit, in her feature debut. It was produced by the Lubin Manufacturing Company and distributed by General Film Company.

Cast 
 Evelyn Nesbit as Miriam Gruenstein
 Bernard Siegel as Isaac Gruenstein
 Jack Clifford as Fedor Tomspky
 Margaret Risser as Rachel Shapiro
 William W. Cohill as Alexis Movak
 Joseph W. Smiley as Ivan Russak
 Russell Thaw as Russell, Fedor's son (credited as Russell William Thaw)
 Joseph Standish as Abraham Solman
 Marguerite Marsh as The Nun

References

External links 
 
 

1914 films
American silent feature films
Lost American films
American black-and-white films
Lubin Manufacturing Company films
Silent American drama films
1914 drama films
1914 lost films
Lost drama films
1910s American films